Yordi Meeuwisse (born 31 January 1988) is a Dutch professional darts player who plays for the Professional Darts Corporation events.

Career

BDO

In 2013, Meeuwisse made his television debut at the Zuiderduin Masters. In his first group match he lost to Ross Montgomery 5–2. Meeuwisse booked an impressive win over Robbie Green 5–4 in the second game. However, it was not enough to come through the group stage. Yordi was also qualified for the Zuiderduin Masters of 2014. After beating Co Stompé 5–2 in his first match, he lost to Tony O'Shea 5–3 in the second game. 

In 2015 Meeuwisse won the Sunparks Masters, having beaten the Lakeside champion Scott Mitchell 3–0 in the final.

PDC
In January 2016, Meeuwisse entered PDC Qualifying School. After losing in the final round on the second day, Meeuwisse secured a tour card by winning the final round on the last day. He qualified for the UK Open, where he lost 6–3 to Robbie Green in the second round. Meeuwisse qualified for his first European Tour event in September, the International Darts Open. In the first round he trailed 5–2 to Brendan Dolan, but managed to win 6–5. He received a bye into the third round after Daryl Gurney withdrew and averaged 100.49 during a 6–2 win over Ryan Meikle to play in his first quarter-final, but lost 6–1 to Mensur Suljović.

In October 2018, Meeuwisse qualified for the PDC World Championship by winning the Western Europe Qualifier. A first round loss at Alexandra Palace to William O'Connor was followed by a visit to PDC European Q-School by Meeuwisse in January 2019.

He was unable to secure one of the four direct Tour Cards on offer, but Meeuwisse finished third on the Order of Merit to seal a PDC Tour Card for the first time and at least two years on the PDC ProTour.

World Championship results

PDC
2019: 1st round (lost to William O'Connor 0–3)

References

External links

1988 births

Living people
Dutch darts players
British Darts Organisation players
Professional Darts Corporation former tour card holders
Sportspeople from The Hague